Gu or Gaow in Iran may refer to:
 Gu, Chabahar
 Gu, Konarak
 Gu, Nik Shahar